The 2007 NHL Entry Draft was the 45th NHL Entry Draft. It was hosted at Nationwide Arena in the city of Columbus, Ohio, on June 22, 2007. The draft consisted of seven rounds with rounds two through seven taking place on June 23, 2007. The draft was televised on TSN and RDS, with the first round simulcasted in the United States on Versus and in Europe on NASN.

Columbus Blue Jackets' President and General Manager Doug MacLean and the NHL announced the event on March 21, 2006. On March 13, 2007, it was reported that NHL owners had voted in favor of changes to the team ranking system which would begin at the 2007 draft. This draft marked the first time in NHL history in which American players were selected with the top two picks, with Patrick Kane and James van Riemsdyk being selected by the Chicago Blackhawks and Philadelphia Flyers, respectively, and also tied the record of the most Americans being selected in the first round with ten players.

Lottery system
Starting with the 2007 NHL Entry Draft, the Stanley Cup champion and runner-up will receive the 30th and 29th picks, respectively. The conference finalists will get the 28th and 27th picks, and all other playoff teams will get picks based on their regular season point totals, but with the division winners getting the latest picks even if they had fewer points during the regular season than a non-division winner.

The draft order of the first 14 picks was determined by a lottery involving the non-playoff teams on April 10.

Under the weighted lottery system, the club with the fewest regular-season points had the greatest chance (25%) of winning the Draft Drawing and could pick no lower than second at the 2007 Entry Draft. The winner of the drawing would move up a maximum of four places, with all other clubs' draft order being adjusted accordingly (no team moving down more than one spot).

The Chicago Blackhawks, originally slated to draft in fifth place, won the lottery and as a result had the first overall pick in the draft.

Draft day trades

June 22

June 23

Central Scouting final rankings
Source: NHL Central Scouting Bureau

Skaters

Goaltenders

Selections by round

Round one

Notes
 The St. Louis Blues' first-round pick went to the San Jose Sharks as the result of a trade on June 22, 2007 that sent Toronto's first and second-round picks in 2007 (13th and 44th overall) and a third-round pick in 2008 to St. Louis in exchange for this pick.
 The Toronto Maple Leafs' first-round pick went to the St. Louis Blues as the result of a trade on June 22, 2007 that sent a first-round pick in 2007 (9th overall) to San Jose in exchange for Toronto's second-round pick in 2007 (44th overall), a third-round pick in 2008 and this pick.
San Jose previously acquired this pick as the result of a trade on June 22, 2007 that sent Vesa Toskala and Mark Bell to Toronto in exchange for a second-round pick in 2007 (44th overall), a fourth-round pick in 2009 and this pick.
 The New York Islanders' first-round pick went to the Edmonton Oilers as the result of a trade on February 27, 2007 that sent Ryan Smyth to New York in exchange for Robert Nilsson, Ryan O'Marra and this pick.
 The Tampa Bay Lightning's first-round pick went to the Minnesota Wild as the result of a trade on June 22, 2007 that sent a first and compensatory second-round pick both in 2007 (19th and 42nd overall) to Anaheim in exchange for this pick.
Anaheim previously acquired this pick as the result of a trade on February 24, 2007 that sent Shane O'Brien and Colorado's third-round pick in 2007 to Tampa Bay in exchange for Gerald Coleman and this pick.
 The Calgary Flames' first-round pick went to the St. Louis Blues as the result of a trade on June 22, 2007 that sent Atlanta's first-round pick and a third-round pick both in 2007 (24th and 70th overall) to Calgary in exchange for this pick.
 The Minnesota Wild's first-round pick went to the Anaheim Ducks as the result of a trade on June 22, 2007 that sent Tampa Bay's first-round pick in 2007 (16th overall) to Minnesota in exchange for a compensatory second-round pick in 2007 (42nd overall) and this pick.
 The Dallas Stars' first-round pick went to the Edmonton Oilers as the result of a trade on June 22, 2007 that sent Anaheim's first-round pick and a second-round pick both in 2007 (30th and 36th overall) to Phoenix in exchange for this pick.
Phoenix previously acquired this pick as the result of a trade on February 12, 2007 that sent Ladislav Nagy to Dallas in exchange for Mathias Tjarnqvist and this pick.
 The San Jose Sharks' first-round pick went to the Montreal Canadiens as the result of a trade on February 25, 2007 that sent Craig Rivet and a fifth-round pick in 2008 to San Jose in exchange for Josh Gorges and this pick.
 The Nashville Predators' first-round pick was re-acquired as the result of a trade on June 18, 2007 that sent Kimmo Timonen and Scott Hartnell to Philadelphia in exchange for this pick.
Philadelphia previously acquired this pick as the result of a trade on February 15, 2007 that sent Peter Forsberg to Nashville in exchange for Ryan Parent, Scottie Upshall, a third-round pick in 2007 and this pick.
 The Atlanta Thrashers' first-round pick went to the Calgary Flames as the result of a trade on June 22, 2007 that sent a first-round pick in 2007 (18th overall) to St. Louis in exchange for a third-round pick in 2007 (70th overall) and this pick.
St. Louis previously acquired this pick as the result of a trade on February 25, 2007 that sent Keith Tkachuk to Atlanta in exchange for Glen Metropolit, a third-round pick in 2007, a conditional first-round pick in 2008, a second-round pick in 2008 and this pick.
 The New Jersey Devils' first-round pick went to the St. Louis Blues as the result of a trade on February 27, 2007 that sent Bill Guerin to San Jose in exchange for Ville Nieminen, Jay Barriball and this pick.
San Jose previously acquired this pick as the result of a trade on October 1, 2006 that sent Alexander Korolyuk and Jim Fahey to New Jersey in exchange for Vladimir Malakhov and this pick (being conditional at the time of the trade). The condition – San Jose will receive a first-round pick in 2007 if Malakhov does not resume his NHL career – was converted as Malakhov never played another game professionally after this trade.
 The Buffalo Sabres' first-round pick went to the San Jose Sharks as the result of a trade on June 22, 2007 that sent Carolina's second-round pick in 2007 and a second-round pick in 2008 to Washington in exchange for this pick.
Washington previously acquired this pick as the result of a trade on February 27, 2007 that sent Dainius Zubrus and Timo Helbling to Buffalo in exchange for Jiri Novotny and this pick.
 The Anaheim Ducks' first-round pick went to the Phoenix Coyotes as the result of a trade on June 22, 2007 that sent Dallas' first-round pick in 2007 (21st overall) to Edmonton in exchange for a second-round pick in 2007 (36th overall) and this pick.
Edmonton previously acquired this pick as the result of a trade on July 3, 2006 that sent Chris Pronger to Anaheim in exchange for Joffrey Lupul, Ladislav Smid, a conditional first-round pick in 2008, a second-round pick in 2008 and this pick.

Round two

Round three

Round four

Round five

Round six

Round seven

Draftees based on nationality

North American draftees by state/province

References

External links
 NHL.com 2007 Entry Draft Complete Selection Order
 2007 NHL Entry Draft player stats at The Internet Hockey Database

Draft
Sports in Columbus, Ohio
National Hockey League Entry Draft
National Hockey League in Ohio
2007 in sports in Ohio